Chase Alan Hooper  (born September 13, 1999) is an American mixed martial artist currently competing in the Featherweight division of the Ultimate Fighting Championship.

Mixed martial arts career 
Hooper began his amateur MMA career while he was still attending Enumclaw High School. On the regional circuit of Washington, Hooper compiled an undefeated 5–0 record with 4 stoppage wins before making his professional debut on October 7, 2017, against Edson Penado. Hooper won the fight via rear-naked choke submission in the first round utilizing his heavy skills in Brazilian jiu-jitsu, in which he's a juvenile Pan American champion as a blue belt.

Dana White's Contender Series 
Hooper competed at Dana White's Contender Series 14 against Canaan Kawaihae. He won the fight via unanimous decision and was awarded a development league contract.

He competed in three more fights (winning two of them and the other one ending in a draw) in notable minor promotions such as CFFC and Titan FC before being signed by the UFC.

Ultimate Fighting Championships 
Hooper made his promotional debut against Daniel Teymur on December 14, 2019, at UFC 245. He won the fight via technical knockout in the first round.

Hooper faced Alex Caceres on June 6, 2020, at UFC 250. He lost the fight via unanimous decision, marking his first professional defeat.

Hooper faced Peter Barrett at UFC 256 on December 12, 2020. He earned a comeback win in the third round via heel hook submission.

Hooper faced Steven Peterson on June 12, 2021, at UFC 263. At the weigh-ins, Peterson weighed in at 148.5 pounds, two and a half pounds over the featherweight non-title fight limit. The bout proceeded at catchweight and he was fined 20% of his purse, which went to Hooper. Hooper lost the fight via unanimous decision.

Hooper faced Felipe Colares on May 21, 2022, at UFC Fight Night 206. He won the fight via technical knockout in round three. This win earned him the Performance of the Night award.

Hooper faced Steve Garcia on October 29, 2022, at UFC Fight Night 213. He lost the fight via TKO in the first round.

Championships and accomplishments

Mixed martial arts

Ultimate Fighting Championship
Performance of the Night (One time) 
Dominate Fighting Championships
 Dominate FC Featherweight Championship (One time)
Rumble on the Ridge
 Rumble on the Ridge Amateur Featherweight Championship (One time)

Brazilian Jiu-jitsu 
Pan American Championships
 2016 Pan American Juvenile Absolute (heavy) runner-up (blue)
 2016 Pan American Juvenile Middleweight champion (blue)

Mixed martial arts record

|Loss
|align=center|11–3–1
|Steve Garcia
|TKO (punches)
|UFC Fight Night: Kattar vs. Allen
|
|align=center|1
|align=center|1:32
|Las Vegas, Nevada, United States
|-->
|-
|Win
|align=center|11–2–1
|Felipe Colares
|TKO (punches)
|UFC Fight Night: Holm vs. Vieira
|
|align=center|3
|align=center|3:00
|Las Vegas, Nevada, United States
|
|-
|Loss
|align=center|10–2–1
|Steven Peterson
|Decision (unanimous)
|UFC 263
|
|align=center|3
|align=center|5:00
|Glendale, Arizona, United States
|
|-
|Win
|align=center|
|Peter Barrett
|Submission (heel hook)
|UFC 256
|
|align=center|3
|align=center|3:02
|Las Vegas, Nevada, United States
|
|-
|Loss
|align=center|9–1–1
|Alex Caceres
|Decision (unanimous)
|UFC 250
|
|align=center|3
|align=center|5:00
|Las Vegas, Nevada, United States
|
|-
|Win
|align=center|9–0–1
|Daniel Teymur
|TKO (elbows and punches)
|UFC 245
|
|align=center|1
|align=center|4:34
|Las Vegas, Nevada, United States
|
|-
|Win
|align=center|8–0–1
|Luis Gomez
|Submission (rear-naked choke)
|Titan FC 55
|
|align=center|1
|align=center|3:31
|Fort Lauderdale, Florida, United States
|
|-
|Win
|align=center|7–0–1
|Sky Moiseichik
|TKO (punches)
|Island Fights 54
|
|align=center|2
|align=center|3:47
|Panama City Beach, Florida, United States
|
|-
|Draw
|align=center|6–0–1
|Lashawn Alcocks
|Draw (split)
|CFFC 71
|
|align=center|3
|align=center|5:00
|Atlantic City, New Jersey, United States
|
|-
|Win
|align=center|6–0
|Canaan Kawaihae
|Decision (unanimous)
|Dana White's Contender Series 14
|
|align=center|3
|align=center|5:00
|Las Vegas, Nevada, United States
|
|-
|Win
|align=center|5–0
|Brett Malone
|Submission (rear-naked choke)
|Combat Games 61
|
|align=center|2
|align=center|4:08
|Snoqualmie, Washington, United States
|
|-
|Win
|align=center|4–0
|Drew Brokenshire
|Decision (unanimous)
|Dominate FC
|
|align=center|5
|align=center|5:00
|Olympia, Washington, United States
|
|-
|Win
|align=center|3–0
|Wyatt Gonzalez
|Submission (triangle choke)
|CageSport 49
|
|align=center|1
|align=center|3:57
|Tacoma, Washington, United States
|
|-
|Win
|align=center|2–0
|Sean Soliz
|TKO (punches)
|CageSport 48
|
|align=center|1
|align=center|3:01
|Tacoma, Washington, United States
|
|-
|Win
|align=center|1–0
|Edson Penado
|Submission (rear-naked choke)
|Rumble on the Ridge 40
|
|align=center|1
|align=center|2:45
|Snoqualmie, Washington, United States
|
|}

Amateur mixed martial arts record

|-
|  Win
|align=center| 5–0
|Jorge Alcala
|Submission (rear-naked choke)
|Summer Showdown 4
|August 25, 2017
|align=center|1
|align=center|2:45
|Tulalip, Washington, United States
|
|-
| Win
|align=center| 4–0
|Gurpal Sahota
|Submission (guillotine choke)
|Rumble on the Ridge 38
|May 20, 2017
|align=center|1
|align=center|0:53
|Snoqualmie, Washington, United States
|
|-
| Win
|align=center| 3–0
|Byron Fernandus Jr
|Submission (guillotine choke)
|Supreme Showdown 2
|February 17, 2017
|align=center|1
|align=center|0:26
|Quil Ceda Village, Washington, United States
|
|-
|Win
|align=center|2–0
|Luke Main
|Submission (rear-naked choke)
|Reign FC
|November 26, 2016
|align=center|1
|align=center|2:15
|Suquamish, Washington, United States
|
|-
|Win
|align=center| 1–0
|Patrick Harris
|TKO (punches)
|Rumble on the Ridge 36
|October 1, 2016
|align=center|1
|align=center|2:10
|Snoqualmie, Washington, United States
|
|-
|}

Submission Grappling record

See also 
 List of current UFC fighters
 List of male mixed martial artists

External links

References 

1999 births
Living people
American male mixed martial artists
Featherweight mixed martial artists
Mixed martial artists utilizing Brazilian jiu-jitsu
People from Enumclaw, Washington
Ultimate Fighting Championship male fighters
American practitioners of Brazilian jiu-jitsu
People awarded a black belt in Brazilian jiu-jitsu